Fatima Zahra El Hayani (born 23 September 1996) is a Moroccan professional racing cyclist, who currently rides for UCI Women's Continental Team . El Hayani became the national road race champion in 2018 and 2019 and also became the national time trial champion in 2018, winning the silver medal in 2019. She competes at the international women's races, including at the UCI Women's World Tour. She represented Morocco in the women's road race event at the 2020 UCI Road World Championships.

References

External links

1996 births
Living people
Moroccan female cyclists
Place of birth missing (living people)
21st-century Moroccan women